Selwyn Caesar (born 16 May 1936) is a Trinidadian cricketer. He played in ten first-class matches for Trinidad and Tobago from 1959 to 1964.

See also
 List of Trinidadian representative cricketers

References

External links
 

1936 births
Living people
Trinidad and Tobago cricketers